Limannoye is the name of several rural localities in Russia:
Limannoye, Seryshevsky District, Amur Oblast, a selo in Limannovsky Selsoviet of Seryshevsky District, Amur Oblast
Limannoye, Tambovsky District, Amur Oblast, a selo in Novoalexandrovsky Selsoviet of Tambovsky District, Amur Oblast